The 2023 RFL Women's Super League (also known as the Betfred Women's Super League for sponsorship reasons) will be the seventh season of the Women's Super League, for female players in clubs affiliated to the Rugby Football League (RFL).

The season will begin on 9 April, with current champions Leeds taking on York Valkyrie at Headingley, whilst the 10 remaining teams will kick off their season on 16 April.

Group 1 comprises Huddersfield, Leeds, St Helens, Warrington, Wigan and York.

Group 2 comprises Barrow, Bradford, Castleford,  Featherstone, Leigh Leopards and Salford.

Teams
Italics indicates a semi professional club (all others are amateur).

Group 1

  Huddersfield Giants
  Leeds Rhinos
  St Helens
  Warrington Wolves
  Wigan Warriors
  York Valkyrie

Group 2

  Barrow Raiders
  Bradford Bulls
  Castleford Tigers
  Featherstone Rovers
  Leigh Leopards
  Salford Red Devils

Fixtures and results

Regular season tables

Group 1

Playoffs

Group 2

Playoffs

References

RFL Women's Super League
2023 in English rugby league
2023 in English women's sport
2023 in women's rugby league